The European Judo Championships is the Judo European Championship organized by the European Judo Union. The 2015 and 2019 editions were held during the respective European Games. This is also expected for future editions of the European Games.

Senior Editions

Men's Competitions

Men's and Women's Competitions

Combined Competitions

Open

Team

Mixed Team

Youth Championship
Judo European Youth Championship organized by the European Judo Union.

Veterans Championship

European Veterans Judo Championships organized by the European Judo Union since 2009.

Not held in 2020 and 2021.

All-time medal table (1951 - 2022)
List of European Judo Championships medalists

This table include all medals in the individual and team competitions won at the European Judo Championships as well as at the separate European Judo Team Championships and separate European Judo Open Championships. 

Updated after the 2022 European Judo Championships.

See also
 IBSA European Judo Championships (Blind)
 2021 European Kata Judo Championships

References

External links
 Judo Union
 European Judo Union
 JudoInside - Statsgen Judoka
 Judobase.org

 
European Championships
Judo
 
Recurring sporting events established in 1951